The men's mass start competition of the Biathlon World Championships 2012 was held on March 11, 2012 at 13:30 local time.

Results 
The race started at 13:30.

References

Biathlon World Championships 2012